The Port Angeles Lefties are a collegiate summer baseball team based in Port Angeles, Washington. The Lefties are members of the West Coast League and play their home games at Civic Field.

History
The Kitsap BlueJackets were founding members of the West Coast League, but the club had suffered from poor attendance. Owner Matt Acker sought to relocate the franchise to Port Angeles. Acker gained approval to move the franchise to the Olympic Peninsula. Upon relocating, the club held a name-the-team contest. The name Lefties was selected. The Lefties team name derives from the region being considered Upper Left of the United States. The team colors of blue and orange represent the beautiful Port Angeles sunset, and the team mascot Timber is based on the Olympic Marmots native to the local Olympic Mountains.

2017
The Port Angeles Lefties entered the league with play in the 2017 season and went 19–34, placing 6th place in the North Division of the West Coast League. A total of 36,883 fans attended home games at Civic Field, placing 3rd in total attendance in the West Coast League. The Lefties opened their team store in the heart of downtown Port Angeles.

2018
The Port Angeles Lefties went 21–33, placing 6th place in the North Division of the West Coast League. A total of 35,867 fans attended home games, placing 4th in per game attendance in the West Coast League. The Port Angeles Lefties hosted the 2018 West Coast League All-Star Game and Home Run Derby.

2019
The Port Angeles Lefties went 22–32, placing 4th place in the North Division of the West Coast League.

2020
The Port Angeles Lefties 2020 regular season began on May 29, 2020.

2022
The Port Angeles Lefties are fifth in the North Division with an 11-14 record and are 7.5 games behind the division leading Bellingham Bells. Infielder Riley Parker (Cal State San Bernardino) (Snohomish, WA) is seventh in the league in RBIs (15). Pitchers Andrew Hauck (Utah Valley College) and Liam Paddack (Spokane Falls Community College) are both in the top seven with three wins each. Pitcher John Pfeffer (Cal State San Bernardino) leads the league in strikeouts (31) and is sixth in ERA (1.73). The Lefties have sold 12,641 tickets for an average of 1,405 fans per game.

On June 14, 2022, the Lefties signed former NFL wide-receiver Golden Tate. Tate made his debut that evening going 2 for 4 at the plate. Tate recorded two base hits, a RBI, a run and one stolen base in his debut.

Notable alumni 
 Alex Junior: New York Yankees franchise (2018 Draft)
 Brennon Kaleiwahea: Seattle Mariners franchise (2018 Draft)
 Trayson Kubo: Oakland Athletics franchise (2019 Draft)
 Sean Roby: San Francisco Giants franchise (2018 Draft)
 Garret Westberg: Seattle Mariners franchise (2019 Draft)
 Golden Tate: NFL Wide Receiver

References

External links
 Port Angeles Lefties official website
 West Coast League website

Amateur baseball teams in Washington (state)
Port Angeles, Washington
2017 establishments in Washington (state)
Baseball teams established in 2017